was the 2nd (and final) Abe daimyō of Tanagura Domain.

Biography
Abe Masakoto was the son of Abe Masahisa, 6th daimyō  of Shirakawa Domain, and was born to a maid at the domain's Edo residence. Due to his low birth and as he was only an infant when his father died, the position of daimyō when to a cadet branch of the family in the form of Abe Masakiyo. Abe Masakiyo was transferred from Shirakawa Domain to Tanagura Domain by the Tokugawa shogunate. However, following the defeat of the Ōuetsu Reppan Dōmei during the Boshin War, the victorious Meiji government reduced the kokudaka of Tanagura from 100,000 to 60,000 koku, and forced Abe Masakiyo into retirement. Abe Masakoto, at the age of seven was appointed daimyō of Tanagura. However, only six months later, with the abolition of the han system, the position of  daimyō  was abolished, and he became Imperial governor of Tanagura. During his short tenure, he authorized the formation of a han school. 

In 1871, Tanagura was absorbed into the new Fukushima Prefecture, and Abe Masakoto relocated to Tokyo. From 1873, he enrolled in Keio University. He also invested heavily in land in the Azabu neighborhood of Tokyo and was a major shareholder in the No.15 Bank. He also learned English and was an avid amateur archaeologist. In 1884, he received the kazoku peerage title of shishaku (viscount). HIs wife was a daughter of Tokudaiji Kin'ito.

Fudai daimyo
Abe clan
1860 births
1925 deaths
Kazoku